Yohann Duport, better known by his stage name AP, based on "Al Pacino" (born in Vitry-sur-Seine, suburbs of Paris, France in 1979), is a French rapper whose parents originated from Guadeloupe in the French Antilles (French West Indies).

In 1994, AP started rapping at the age of 15 in the Paris suburbs, mainly Vitry-sur-Seine. He became a founding member of music collective 113 alongside Rim'K and Mokobé and part of a bigger music project collective called Mafia K-1 Fry. He has also his own solo career including albums Discret released in 2009 where he is credited as AP du 113 with the album reaching #22 in SNEP French Albums Chart. He has co-directed and co-produced the compilation Zone Caraïbes in 2005.

Discography

Albums
Solo albums

Compilations
2005: Zone Caraïbes (compilation co-produced by AP)
With 113
2000: Les Princes de la ville (certified platinum)
2002: 113 fout la merde (certified gold)
2003: Dans L'urgence (reedition) (certified gold)
2005: 113 Degrés (certified gold)
2010: Universel
With Mafia K-1 Fry
2003: La cerise sur le ghetto
2007: Jusqu'à la mort

Singles
Featured in
2009: "Relève la tête" (credited to Kery James presenting Lino, AP, Diam's, Passi, Matt & Kool Shen) (reached #39 in SNEP French Singles Chart)

References

French rappers
French people of Guadeloupean descent
1979 births
Living people
Rappers from Val-de-Marne